The Idrija Fault is a seismically active fault in Slovenia. It strikes NW–SE and the fault plane dips towards the northeast. The activity along the fault started in the Miocene with normal faulting and changed to dextral strike-slip in Pliocene. The fault was first described by Marko Vincenc Lipold, a geologist from Slovenia.

Present displacement is measured and varies along strike but is in the order of magnitude of 0.1 mm per year. The strongest earthquake along the Idrija Fault was the 1511 Western Slovenia earthquake (or 1511 Idrija earthquake), which took place on 26 March 1511, had a magnitude of 6.8, and caused about 12,000 deaths.

References

Geology of Slovenia
Dinaric Alps
Seismic faults of Europe